The 2016–17 1. FC Magdeburg season was their second season in the 3. Liga. As in the previous season, the side finished fourth overall, qualifying for the 2017–18 DFB-Pokal. In addition, Magdeburg won the Saxony-Anhalt Cup, increasing their record to 11 wins in that competition. Their run in the 2016–17 DFB-Pokal was cut short, when the team lost to eventual finalists Eintracht Frankfurt on penalties in the first round.

Events

Transfers

In

Out

Preseason and friendlies

3. Liga

3. Liga fixtures & results

League table

DFB-Pokal

Saxony-Anhalt Cup

Saxony-Anhalt Cup review

Saxony-Anhalt Cup results

Player information

|}

Notes
A.   Kickoff time in Central European Time/Central European Summer Time.
B.   1. FC Magdeburg goals first.
C.  The match against Zwickau on matchday 2 had to be postponed as Zwickau's stadium was not completed and there was no replacement stadium available.

References

1. FC Magdeburg seasons
Magdeburg